Federal Ministry of Health may refer to:

 Federal Ministry of Health (Germany)
 Federal Ministry of Health (Nigeria)